This is a bibliography of works about Opus Dei, also known as the Prelature of the Holy Cross and Opus Dei, which was founded by Josemaría Escrivá.

By Opus Dei members and publishers 
 1982 Statutes of Opus Dei—Latin and English (unauthorized translation)
 —a French scholar's synthesis 
 —two canonists and a theologian study the juridical nature and history of Opus Dei
 O'Connor, William: Opus Dei: An Open Book. A Reply to the Secret World of Opus Dei by Michael Walsh,  Mercier 1991
 —a 5-year research in 10 countries conducted by a senior journalist and deputy editor of the Australian
 John Coverdale: Uncommon Faith: The Early Years of Opus Dei (1928-1943), Scepter Publications, 2002. 
 —professor of anthropology explains various aspects of Opus Dei
 
 François Gondrand, At God's Pace, Scepter 1989. 
 José Orlandis, Mis recuerdos: primeros tiempos del Opus Dei en Roma Rialp, 1995 
 —an ecclesiological and theological study of Opus Dei
 —a study of an Italian essayist
 
 Antonio Viana, “Law and spirit: on the 20th anniversary of the establishment of Opus Dei as a Personal Prelature,” Number 36, January–June 2003, Romana.
 
Joaquin Navarro Valls. The Human Realism of Sanctity. Information Office of Opus Dei on the   Internet.

By others 
 John Paul II, Papal Bull Ut Sit Establishing the Personal Prelature of Opus Dei
 John Paul II, Christifideles Omnes, Papal Decree on Escriva's Heroic Virtues
Cardinal Joseph Ratzinger (Benedict XVI), Opus Dei and St. Josemaria: Letting God work
 Cardinal José Saraiva Martins, St. Josemaria: God's Instrument for Opus Dei 
Richard John Neuhaus, The Work of God in "First Things."
 Allen, John Jr. (2005). Opus Dei: an Objective Look Behind the Myths and Reality of the Most Controversial Force in the Catholic Church, Doubleday Religion.  — book written after 300 hours of interviews by a journalist of National Catholic Reporter, a left leaning newspaper; link refers to a summary Q&A
Allen, John Jr. (2005). Opus Dei: An Introduction, Chapter I: A Quick Overview, Chapter 4: Contemplatives in the Middle of the World, Chapter 7: Opus Dei and Secrecy - 4 on-line excerpts from John Allen's Opus Dei
 Allen, John Jr. (24 March 2005). "Decoding Opus Dei". An Interview with John Allen, by Edward Pentin. Newsweek. — a short summary of his book
Allen, John Jr. (14 December 2005). Opus Dei: The First Objective Look Behind the Myths and Reality of the Most Controversial Force in the Catholic Church. Carnegie Council, New York City. — edited transcript of remarks, part of The Resurgence of Religion in Politics Series
 Allen, John Jr. (January 2006). "Unveiling Opus Dei". An Interview with John Allen, by John Romanowsky. Godspy.
 E.B.E - "Opus Dei as divine revelation" (2016, 576 pages). An historical and theological study by a former member. It includes unpublished historical documents (the Regulations of 1941, several letters of Escrivá to Franco, documents about Escrivá's request for being appointed bishop, etc.).  (paperback) and ASIN: B01D5MNGD2 (ebook - Amazon). Online Preview on Amazon website here
 —an investigation (Un' indagine, the original Italian title) done by a journalist 
 —the first serious study on Opus Dei to be published, written by a French journalist
 
 
 Massimo Introvigne, Opus Dei and the Anti-cult Movement in Cristianità n. 229 (1994)
 
 
 
 
 Christoph Cardinal Schönborn, "Are there sects in the Catholic Church?" L'Osservatore Romano Weekly Edition in English, 13/20 August 1997, page 3.
  
 

Silver, Vernon; Smith, Michael. 30 April 2006. "Opus Dei's spiritual quest rooted in work, business". Bloomberg News.
The Economic Times. (20 May 2006). "We are no ruthless cult, says Opus Dei"
Deborah Dundas. (19 May 2006). Inside Opus Dei
Brancoli, Rodolfo (June–July 2002). "Il fantasma dell'Opera: Storia di un'avversione che si sta trasformando in simpatia". Liberal. — "The Phantom of the Opus ('Opera')": story of an aversion that is turning into understanding." An article in a left-of-centre Italian magazine
 Gaspari, Antonio (June–July 1995). "A New Way for the Church?". Inside the Vatican. Provided courtesy of EWTN
Goodstein, Laurie (7 February 2006). "Group Says of 'Da Vinci Code' Film: It's Just Fiction". New York Times.
Howse, Christopher (October 2005). Out of the Shadows: Book Review of Allen's Opus Dei: Secrets and Power in the Catholic Church. Tablet.
 Introvigne, Massimo (May 1994). "Opus Dei and the Anti-cult Movement". Cristianità, 229, p. 3-12.
König, Franz Cardinal (9 November 1975). "Il significato dell Opus Dei". Corriere della Sera.
Luciani, Albino Cardinal (John Paul I) (25 July 78). "Seeking God through everyday work". Il Gazzettino Venice.
 Martin, James, S.J. (25 February 1995). "Opus Dei in the United States". America.
Martins, José Saraiva. (9 October 2002). "St. Josemaría: God's instrument for the Work". L'Osservatore Romano.
  — an investigation (Un' indagine, the original Italian title) done by the journalist behind Crossing the Threshold of Hope and the Ratzinger Report
Neuhaus, Richard John (November 1995). "The Work of God". First Things, 57, p. 71-87. 
Ratzinger, Joseph Cardinal (Benedict XVI) (9 October 2002). "St. Josemaria: God is very much at work in our world today". L'Osservatore Romano Weekly Edition in English, p. 3.
 Royal, Robert (May 1998). "Books in Review: Opus Dei". First Things. 83, p. 56-59.
  — the first serious study on Opus Dei to be published, written by a French journalist
Van Biema, David (24 April 2006). "The Ways of Opus Dei". Time. Cover Story.

About Opus Dei in Spain 

 Arango, E. Ramón. 1995 (1985). Spain. Democracy Regained (Second Edition). Boulder, CO: Westview. 
 Carr, Raymond, and Fusi, Juan Pablo. 1991 (1979). Spain: Dictatorship to democracy. London: Routledge. 
 De Blaye, Edouard. 1976 (1974). Franco and the Politics of Spain. Middlessex: Penguin. [original title Franco ou la monarchie sans roi, Editions Stock] 
Descola, Jean. O Espagne, Albin Michel, Paris, 1976.
 Ellwood, Sheelagh. 1994. Franco. Harlow, UK: Longman. 
 Graham, Robert. 1984. Spain. Change of a Nation. London: Michael Joseph. 
 Gunther, Richard. 1980. Public Policy in a No-Party State. Spanish Planning and Budgeting in the Twilight of the Franquist Era. Berkeley, CA: University of California.
 Gunther. Richard. 1980. Public Policy in a No-Party State. Spanish Planning and Budgeting in the Twilight of the Franquist Era. Berkeley: University of California. 
 Herr, Richard. 1971. Spain. Englewood Cliffs, NJ: Prentice-Hall. 
 Hills, George. 1970. Spain. London: Ernest Benn Ltd.
Paredes, Javier (coord.), Historia contemporánea de España (siglo XX), Ariel Historia, Barcelona 1998.
 Payne, Stanley G. 1999. Fascism in Spain. 1923-1977. Madison, WI: Wisconsin University. 
 Preston, Paul. 1990. The Politics of Revenge. Fascism and the Military in Twentieth-Century Spain. London. Unwin Hyman. 
 Preston, Paul. 1993. Franco. A Biography. London: HarperCollins.
 Salgado Araujo, Francisco Franco, Mis conversaciones privadas con Franco, Col. Espejo de España, Ed. Planeta, 1976.
Tusell, Javier. Manual Historia de España: Siglo XX, Historia 16, Madrid, 1990.
Various Authors, (Manuel Ferrer, José de Armas, José Lino Feo, Manuel Fernández Areal, Charles Powell, Alfonso Ascanio), Franquismo y transición democrática: Lecciones recientes de Historia reciente de España, Centro de Estudios de Humanidades, Las Palmas de Gran Canaria, 1993.

In Spanish 

Francisco Ponz, Mi encuentro con el fundador del Opus Dei
Flavio Capucci, Milagros de nuestro tiempo
Dominique Le Tourneau, Opus Dei
William West, Opus Dei. Ficción y realidad
Pedro Casciaro, Soñad y os quedareis cortos
Manuel Monteiro de Castro, Josemaría Escrivá fue un "extraordinario hijo de la Iglesia"  (31-1-2002)- Testimony of the Nuncio of Spain
"La aventura de ser santo", Miguel Ángel Cárceles
"El hombre de Villa Tevere", Pilar Urbano
"El Fundador del Opus Dei", Andrés Vázquez de Prada

Videos
Opus Dei unveiled. (2006). History Channel. – directed and produced by George Tzimopoulos and Bill Brummel Productions
Opus Dei: Decoding God's Work. (June 2006). Salt and Light Catholic Television. Co-directed with Marc Boudignon 
Saint of Ordinary Life. – by Alberto Michelini

Opus Dei
Christian bibliographies